Denis Lapaczinski (born 26 September 1981) is a German former professional football player and manager who played as a defender.

Playing career 
Lapaczinski was born in Reutlingen. He spent four seasons in the Bundesliga with Hertha BSC and Hansa Rostock.

Coaching career
Lapaczinski, along with Petros Tengelidis, became co–interim head coach of Reutlingen 05 on 24 November 2011. They managed two matches before Reutlingen 05 hired Murat Isik as their new head coach on 31 December 2011.

Coaching record

Honours
 DFB-Ligapokal: 2001, 2002

References

1981 births
Living people
German footballers
Association football defenders
Germany youth international footballers
Germany under-21 international footballers
Bundesliga players
2. Bundesliga players
SSV Reutlingen 05 players
Hertha BSC players
FC Hansa Rostock players
TSG 1899 Hoffenheim players
FC Schalke 04 players
FC Schalke 04 II players
German football managers
SSV Reutlingen 05 managers
People from Reutlingen
Sportspeople from Tübingen (region)
Footballers from Baden-Württemberg